Kanai Yoshiko (born 1944) is Japanese academic and feminist theorist. She explored the complexities of the feminist movements in Japan and the difficulty in launching women's studies in a society bound by dualistic definitions of gender. Coining the phrase "housewife feminism", she addressed how Japanese society had attempted to appease women without addressing the underlying systemic problems that continued to foster inequality.

Early life
Kanai Yoshiko was born in 1944  in Yokosuka, Kanagawa Prefecture, Japan. She graduated from the University of Tokyo (UT) with a degree in literature and philosophy in 1967 and went on to further her education at UT, earning a master's degree education and ethics.

Career
Kanai began her career at the newly established Nagaoka Women's Junior College in 1971. She was one of the first academics in Japan to focus on women's studies. She remained at Nagaoka Junior College until 1999, when she accepted a position at Yokohama National University in the Human Sciences Department. She reached the university's mandatory retirement barrier in 2010 and took a post in the philosophy and letters department at Rissho University, from which she retired in 2015. 

Kanai was most known as a specialist in gender studies and ethics, writing numerous books analyzing the feminist movement in Japan and its limitations. She coined the phrase "housewife feminism" to refer to a particular type of issues-based feminism, where the official response establishes quotas and training to counteract imbalances, but does nothing to address the underlying systemic biases. She argued that rather than giving women real power for their own development, the focus of identity politics on nationalist and traditional aims provided pacifiers, such as men taking on more household duties, and led to continued co-opting of women's ability to define themselves and direct policies which affected them. In turn, she found that no radical feminist movement developed in Japan, because women readily accepted a binary gender model and succumbed to pressure to define themselves in the role of wife. By accepting traditional roles, Japanese motherhood is glorified and a one-size-fits-all approach is used to address issues. She has noted that the failure to grasp that "…equality of sexual power [is] a human right of women and sexual violence against women [is] a violation of human rights" was a stumbling block to women's empowerment.

Selected works

References

Citations

Bibliography

1944 births
Living people
People from Yokosuka, Kanagawa
University of Tokyo alumni
Academic staff of Yokohama National University
Academic staff of Rissho University
Japanese feminists
Gender studies academics